Walter Palmer may refer to:

 Walter Palmer (basketball) (born 1968), American former basketball player
 Walter Palmer (Puritan) (1585–1661), early Separatist Puritan settler in the Massachusetts Bay Colony
 Walter Launt Palmer, American Impressionist painter
 Walter D. Palmer, American politician from New York
 Sir Walter Palmer, 1st Baronet (1858–1910), British biscuit manufacturer and Conservative politician
 Walter Palmer (born 1960), American big-game hunter and dentist notable for the killing of Cecil the lion